Jemaa el-Fnaa ( Sāḥat Jāmiʾ al-Fanāʾ, also Jemaa el-Fna, Djema el-Fna or Djemaa el-Fnaa) is a square and market place in Marrakesh's medina quarter (old city). It remains the main square of Marrakesh, used by locals and tourists.

Name
The origin of its name is unclear: jamaa means "congregation" or "mosque" in Arabic, probably referring to a destroyed mosque on the site. Fnaʼ or fanâʼ can mean "death/extinction" or "a courtyard, space in front of a building". "finâʼ in Arabic commonly means "open area"; a straight translation would be "the gathering/congregation area". Other meanings could be "The assembly of death," or "The Mosque at the End of the World". Another explanation is that it refers to a mosque with a distinctive courtyard or square in front of it. A third translation is "assembly of the dead", referring to public executions on the plaza around 1050 CE.

One specific explanation endorsed by modern historians comes from historical reports that the powerful Saadian sultan Ahmad al-Mansur (ruled 1578–1603) had embarked on the construction of a monumental Friday mosque in the middle of the square. However, due to a downturn in fortunes (probably outbreaks of the plague) the sultan was forced to abandon the project part-way through. The mosque thus remained unfinished and fell into ruins. The ruined outline of its walls was apparently still visible in the 19th century and corresponded roughly to the current site of the "Souk Jdid" (the "new souk" just north of the food-stalls). In this way, "jamaa al-fna' " ostensibly refers to the place of the "ruined mosque". The name "Jamaa al-Fna' " appears in historical records for the first time in the 17th-century chronicle of the West African historian Abderrahman as-Sa'idi. As-Sa'idi claimed that the intended name of al-Mansour's unfinished mosque was jamaa al-hna, meaning "Mosque of Tranquility", but that after its abandonment it came to be known, by popular irony, as the "Mosque of ruination/annihilation", or jamaa al-fana' (the word fana''' in this case meaning a state of being extinguished or totally ruined).

 History 

 Early history: Almoravid and Almohad periods 
Marrakesh was founded by the Almoravid Dynasty in 1070 by Abu Bakr ibn Umar and subsequently developed by his successors. Initially, the city's two main monuments and focal points were the fortress known as Ksar el-Hajjar ("fortress of stone") and the city's first Friday mosque (the site of the future Ben Youssef Mosque). The Ksar el-Hajjar was located directly north of today's Kutubiyya Mosque. The major souk (market) streets of the city thus developed along the roads linking these two important sites and still correspond to the main axis of souks today. At one end of this axis, next to the Ksar el-Hajjar, a large open space existed for temporary and weekly markets. This space was initially known as Rahbat al-Ksar ("the place of the fortress"). Other historical records refer to it as as-Saha al-Kubra ("the grand square"), or simply as as-Saha or ar-Rahba.

The Almoravid emir Ali ibn Yusuf (ruled 1106-1143) soon afterwards constructed a palace directly south of and adjacent to the Ksar el-Hajjar, on the actual site of the later Kutubiyya Mosque. One part of this palace was a monumental stone gate on its east side which faced towards the Rahbat al-Ksar. The gate likely played a symbolic role: it was the entrance to the palace for those seeking an audience with the sovereign, and it's possible the ruler himself would sit, enthroned, before the gate and publicly dispense justice on a weekly basis (a tradition which existed among other Moroccan and Andalusian ruling dynasties). The importance of the great public square in front of the royal palace thus led it to become the place for public executions, military parades, festivals, and other public events until long afterwards.

After a destructive struggle, Marrakech fell to the Almohads in 1147, who undertook many construction projects throughout the city. This included construction of the nearby Kutubiyya Mosque, begun in 1147, which was meant to replace the Almoravid-built Ben Youssef Mosque as the city's main mosque. Notably, a new royal kasbah (citadel) was erected further south by Ya'qub al-Mansur after 1184. As the Almohad rulers moved to the new kasbah, the old Almoravid palace and fortress fell out of use and was eventually torn down (in part to make way for the new Kutubiyya Mosque). Subsequently, with the fortunes of the city, the Jemaa el-Fna saw periods of decline and also renewal.

 Later history: Saadian period to modern times 
Despite the encroachment of new constructions on the edge of the square over time, it never disappeared due to its role as an open market area and as the site of public events. One attempt to fill a large part of the square is reported to have been made by the Saadian sultan Ahmad al-Mansour who attempted to build a monumental mosque in the square. The mosque would have likely followed the same model as the Bab Doukkala and Mouassine Mosques, being deliberately built in the midst of major traffic routes in the city, and would have been accompanied by a number of attendant civic and religious buildings. The mosque was never finished, however, possibly due to disasters like the plague epidemics during al-Mansour's reign. Construction was abandoned part-way through and what had been built fell into ruin and was taken over by market stalls and other occupants. (It is probably also the site of a modern shop complex, Souk Jdid, just north of the food-stalls today, whose outline has the same compass orientation as the mosques of al-Mansour's time.) This ruined mosque may have given the square its current name, Jemaa el-Fna ("Mosque of Ruins").

On January 24, 1864, a massive explosion took place in the area of the square, reportedly caused by the criminal negligence of certain officials trying to avoid a government inspection. A fire in a funduq (commercial warehouse) ignited 500 quintals of gunpowder which were dangerously stored there. The explosion damaged houses and shops in a wide radius and resulted in some 300 deaths.

The square continued to serve as a meeting place at the heart of the city despite having no formal architectural delineation. In addition to its old role as a place of public executions, it was also the site of a traditional Friday market, a stage for the performance of fantasias, and the setting of public entertainment in the evenings (much as today). In 1922 the government (under French administration at the time), passed the first laws aimed at protecting and preserving the square's cultural space and heritage. In 2001 the square was proclaimed an Intangible Cultural Heritage by UNESCO, and in 2008 it was included in UNESCO's List of Intangible Cultural Heritage of Humanity.

The Square

During the day it is predominantly occupied by orange juice stalls, water sellers with traditional leather water-bags and brass cups, youths with chained Barbary apes and snake charmers despite the protected status of these species under Moroccan law.Bergin and Nijman (2014) Open, Unregulated Trade in Wildlife in Morocco’s Markets. TRAFFIC Bulletin Available from researchgate.net, accessed Mar 23, 2015.

As the day progresses, the entertainment on offer changes: the snake charmers depart, and late in the day the square becomes more crowded, with Chleuh dancing-boys (it would be against custom for girls to provide such entertainment), story-tellers (telling their tales in Berber or Arabic, to an audience of locals), magicians, and peddlers of traditional medicines. As darkness falls, the square fills with dozens of food-stalls as the number of people on the square peaks.

The square is edged along one side by the Marrakesh souk, a traditional North African market catering both for the common daily needs of the locals, and for the tourist trade. On other sides are hotels and gardens and café terraces, and narrow streets lead into the alleys of the medina quarter.

The square fulfills an important function for storytellers and helps keep Amazigh/Berber culture alive, and those cultural expressions have drawn worldwide attention. German filmmaker Thomas Ladenburger made a 90-minute documentary on the storytellers, and its importance for tourism received academic attention as well.

 UNESCO Masterpiece of the Oral and Intangible Heritage of Humanity 
The idea of the UNESCO project Masterpieces of the Oral and Intangible Heritage of Humanity came from people concerned about the Jamaa el Fna. The place is known for its active concentration of traditional activities by storytellers, musicians and performers, but it was threatened by economic development pressures. In fighting for the protection of traditions, the residents called for action on an international level to recognize the need for the protection of such places — termed "cultural spaces" — and other popular and traditional forms of cultural expression.

UNESCO encourages communities to identify, document, protect, promote and revitalize such heritage. The UNESCO label aims to raise awareness about the importance of oral and intangible heritage as an essential component of cultural diversity.

2011 bombing

Shortly before noon on April 28, 2011, a blast originating in a café in the square killed 17 people and injured another 25. Initial reports blamed an accidental gas explosion, but officials later blamed "criminals" and "terrorists".

 Trivia 
Jamaa El-Fnaa, Marrakesh's main square, was featured in the fifth episode of the 25th Season of The Amazing Race.
The square was featured in the Alfred Hitchcock movie The Man Who Knew Too Much (1956).
An interesting account of the place in the 1970s can be seen in Esther Freud's novel Hideous Kinky.
Musicians Jimmy Page and Robert Plant recorded some songs and their DVD "No Quarter - Unledded" on the square.
 As the Djemaa el-Fnaa, the square was a featured location in James Michener's 1971 book The Drifters.
Juan Goytisolo lived in Marrakesh and played an important role in the categorization of Jamaa el Fna as one of the Masterpieces of the Oral and Intangible Heritage of Humanity
The square was featured as a photo shoot setting in the TV reality series America's Next Top Model Cycle 16.
Uncorroborated reports claim that political activists have sometimes been imprisoned and abused in the police jail under Jamaa el Fna.
 The book "A Year in Marrakesh" by British travel writer Peter Mayne includes descriptions of the square in the 1950s.

ReferencesThe Rough Guide To Morocco'', 2001. Rough Guide Publishing

External links

 The Time Machine | Photography portfolio about Jamaa El-Fna 
 Official Website | Official Website about Jamaa El-Fna
 BBC news about preserving intangible patrimony
 A Night at Jamaa El-Fna - article in English with many high-quality pictures

Marrakesh
Squares in Morocco
Souqs
Moroccan culture
Masterpieces of the Oral and Intangible Heritage of Humanity
Tourist attractions in Marrakesh